PNC Music Pavilion (originally Blockbuster Pavilion and formerly Verizon Wireless Amphitheatre) is an outdoor amphitheater in Charlotte, North Carolina, that specializes in hosting large concerts. The venue largely replaced the Paladium at Carowinds as the premier outdoor venue in the Metrolina region. It was renamed under a new naming-rights deal with PNC Bank. It has a capacity of 19,500 (7,232 seats under pavilion, 2,221 reserved seats on lawn and 10,000 general admission seats).

The amphitheater is located on Pavilion Boulevard in the University City neighborhood near the US 29/I-485 (Outerbelt) interchange. The venue is operated by Live Nation, a concert company.

The amphitheater hosts many different varieties of acts, including rock, alternative, pop, country, jazz, and rhythm and blues, along with special events and festivals of all kinds.

Former Beatle Paul McCartney's final North American concert of The New World Tour was held at the amphitheater on June 15, 1993. The show was nationally broadcast on Fox, who aired commercials in place of some live songs.

The venue gained some notoriety in 2005, when Simon Le Bon of Duran Duran referred to the city of Charlotte as "Charlotte, Virginia".

The venue is a popular stop for summer tours, usually sandwiched between shows at Raleigh's Coastal Credit Union Music Park and Atlanta's Cellairis Amphitheatre, both of which are similarly sized venues. The Vans Warped Tour, Ozzfest and other traveling festivals generally always make an appearance here.

Events

See also
List of contemporary amphitheatres
Live Nation

References

External links
Official Site
Seating Map

Buildings and structures in Charlotte, North Carolina
Culture of Charlotte, North Carolina
Amphitheaters in North Carolina
Amphitheaters in the United States
Music venues in North Carolina
Tourist attractions in Charlotte, North Carolina